Chiroptonyssus is a genus of bat and bird mites in the family Macronyssidae. There is at least five described species in Chiroptonyssus, C. brennani.

References

Mesostigmata
Articles created by Qbugbot
Parasites of bats